William Stanhope, 1st Earl of Harrington, PC (c. 16838 December 1756) was a British statesman and diplomat.

Life

William Stanhope was born in 1683 at the family home in Elvaston, Derbyshire, third surviving son of John Stanhope and Dorothy Agard. His elder brother Charles Stanhope (1673–1760) was also a politician and deeply involved in the South Sea Company financial scandal, while his cousin James Stanhope (1673–1721) is considered an alternative candidate to Robert Walpole for the title of Britain's first Prime Minister.

He married Anne Griffiths, who died in 1719 giving birth to twin sons, William, 2nd Earl of Harrington (1719–1779) and Thomas (1719–1743).

Career
Educated at Eton College, Stanhope was commissioned in 1703 as a lieutenant in the 2nd Foot Guards during the War of the Spanish Succession, before transferring to the 3rd Foot Guards in Spain. By 1710, he was a lieutenant-colonel and missed the December 1710 Battle of Brihuega, when the British rearguard under his cousin James Stanhope was cut off and forced to surrender. In March 1711, he became Colonel of the former Lepells Regiment, which was disbanded in November 1712 as the army was cut back in the run-up to the 1713 Peace of Utrecht.

Stanhope was serving as a diplomat in Spain when the War of the Quadruple Alliance began in 1719 and joined the French army under the Duke of Berwick as a volunteer. He accompanied Berwick's army during its successful Siege of San Sebastian.  When the war ended in 1720, Stanhope was appointed British ambassador to Spain and given the Colonelcy of the 13th Light Dragoons, later 13th Hussars; he retained this position until the Anglo-Spanish War began in March 1727, having built up his reputation as a diplomatist during a difficult period. 

As a reward for his part in negotiating the 1729 Treaty of Seville that ended the war, he was created Baron Harrington in January 1730. Later the same year, he replaced Lord Townshend as Secretary of State for the Northern Department under Robert Walpole. Despite policy differences over British involvement in the 1734–1735 war, he kept his position until Walpole's fall in 1742, when he became Lord President of the Council and created Earl of Harrington and Viscount Petersham.

With the support of his political ally the Duke of Newcastle, he was restored as Secretary of State in 1744 but resigned in February 1746 over his preference for an immediate end to the 1740–1748 War of the Austrian Succession. He was made Lord Lieutenant of Ireland from 1747 to 1751 and while his active military career finished in 1720, he received a number of promotions, ending a full General in 1747. He died in London on 8 December 1756.

References

Sources
 
 
 

|-

1683 births
1756 deaths
People educated at Eton College
British MPs 1715–1722
British MPs 1727–1734
Diplomatic peers
Peers of Great Britain created by George II
1
Lord Presidents of the Council
Members of the Privy Council of Great Britain
Stanhope, William
Secretaries of State for the Northern Department
Wikipedia articles incorporating text from the 1911 Encyclopædia Britannica
Ambassadors of Great Britain to Spain
William
Fellows of the Royal Society
13th Hussars officers
Coldstream Guards officers
Scots Guards officers
Members of the Parliament of Great Britain for constituencies in Derbyshire
Lords Lieutenant of Ireland
Leaders of the House of Lords